is a 1985 Japanese film directed by Masaharu Segawa.

Cast
 Takeshi Kitano
 Kie Nakai
 Shingo Yanagisawa
 Saburo Ishikura
 Midori Kiuchi

Reception
Kie Nakai won the Award for Best Supporting Actress at the 7th Yokohama Film Festival.

References

External links
 

1985 films
Films directed by Masaharu Segawa
1980s Japanese films